Almaz is a Soviet military space station program.

Almaz, meaning "diamond" in Amharic, Arabic, Russian and a number of other languages, may also refer to:

Military
 Almaz (Belarus), a police tactical unit of the Belarusian Militsiya
 NPO Almaz, a Soviet/Russian military R&D enterprise
 Almaz-Antey, a Russian state-owned company in the arms industry
 Almaz Shipbuilding Company
 Russian cruiser Almaz, launched in 1903
 Almaz, a sister ship to the Russian research vessel Yantar

Other
 "Almaz" (song), by US singer Randy Crawford from her 1986 album Abstract Emotions
 Almaz, Iran, a village in East Azerbaijan Province
 Ahmet Almaz, Turkish journalist, translator, and non-fiction writer
 Excalibur Almaz, defunct spacecraft company based in the Isle of Man
 Wuling Almaz, a rebadged Baojun 530 compact SUV marketed by Wuling Motors for the Indonesian market
 A character in the video game Disgaea 3: Absence of Justice
 A Russian-made 135 mm camera with a Pentax K-mount

See also
 Almas (disambiguation)